Russell Lake West is a planned residential subdivision and commercial development in the eastern part of the community of Dartmouth in the Halifax Regional Municipality, Nova Scotia. The area began construction in 2006 with the creation of Exit 8 on Highway 111, providing access from the southwest to the area via Mount Hope Avenue, which as of October 2011, Exit 8 also provides direct access into the Woodside Industrial Park. Russell Lake West is located next to the community of Woodside and a park and walking trails provide direct access to and from Woodside.

Business
The primary commercial area of Russell Lake West is located immediately adjacent to exit 8 from highway 111. There is a primary retail area centred on the 111 interchange with Mount Hope Avenue, with some pre-existing retail built between 2008 and 2010, with more land in the area zoned for commercial use. The recently constructed retail plaza, called Millstone Square and contains a mixture of small business as well as larger retail tenants.

Millstone Square is a plaza style commercial area and is anchored by Sobeys, Kent Building Supplies and Lawtons Drugs, other tenants in Millstone Square include:

Future Retail Development

A new 20 000 sq. ft retail centre "Baker Drive Centre" is currently available for pre-lease for Baker Dr. near Lindenwood Terrace. A new retail plaza is currently slated to be developed along Baker Dr. opposite to Millstone Square and Sobeys.

Community

The residential portion of Russell Lake West is made up of a mix of low density single-family dwellings, as well as medium density townhomes and higher density condominium and apartment lowrises, several of them catering to a more mature or elderly demographic. There is also a Shannex residence, "Parkland at the Lakes" located at the bottom of Baker Drive in the area near the lake opposite to Freshwater Trail.

With the neighbourhood being located on Russell Lake, many homes backing directly onto the lake itself, there are restrictions to residents including rules which restrict traffic on the lake due to the wildlife in the area.

An area (yet to be developed) on Basswood Terrace was initially a proposed site for an elementary school, however due to nearby Portland Estates Elementary School on the opposite side of the lake the Halifax Regional School Board deemed it unnecessary for another school so close, so the site was re-zoned for high density residential and is currently awaiting development.

One interesting item in the Russell Lake West area is the Osprey Nest at the northern head of Russell Lake itself near the water shed.  The nest is perched on top of a pole placed there by Nova Scotia Power.  The pole was put in place after it was noticed that numerous power outages were happening as a result of the nest being on a power pole in the area.  Nova Scotia Power also installed a WebCam to view the nest and the egg hatching in Real-time.

Parks

A series of walking trails run throughout the community, connecting streets at small open greenspaces and playgrounds and providing a connection to the trails that already existed around the north end of the shore of the lake in Russell Lake Park.

Transit

Public transit is provided by Metro Transit on Route #57 which runs along Baker Drive through Russell Lake West, providing connections to the Woodside Industrial Park, the Woodside Ferry Terminal, Penhorn Terminal, Portland Hills Terminal, and connects the adjacent communities of  Woodside, Portland Street, Portland Estates, and Portland Hills.

References

 Website

Communities in Halifax, Nova Scotia